is a Japanese anime series with 25 episodes. Hiroshi Watanabe directed the series and was produced by Studio Deen. Tactics was licensed and distributed by Manga Entertainment for its English release. Tactics is based on the manga with the same name, and follows the life of Kantarou, a man who can see youkai, Haruka, a demon-eating tengu, and Youko, a kitsune. When he was young, Kantarou was ostracized for his ability to see mythical beasts and youkai; for this reason, he decided to seek out the legendary demon-eating tengu to make himself stronger. Kantarou succeeds and names him Haruka, therefore becoming his master. The plot of the series revolves around the various jobs and adventures that, Kantarou, Haruka, and Yoko, three paranormal investigators, have and Haruka's struggle with his returning memories.

Tactics originally aired on TV Tokyo between October 5, 2004 and March 29, 2005. In the United States, it was featured on the Ani-Monday program from January 7, 2008 to April 21, 2008 on the Sci Fi Channel. Both were sung by Miki Akiyama, composed and arranged by Kazuya Nishioka, and lyrics written by Yuriko Mori. The series was first released on DVD in English on June 27, 2006. A total of 5 DVDs were released, each containing 5 episodes apiece. On February 12, 2008, a box set with all 5 of the DVDs was released. In Japan, seven DVD volumes were released. In the US, the company Starz began offering Tactics episodes on the Apple iTunes Store.



Episode list

References

External links
 TV-Tokyo's Official Tactics Website 

Tactics